The WHA's East Division was formed in 1972. The division existed for five seasons until 1977. In 1972, the WHA was formed with 12 teams, split into two divisions of six teams each, with the other division being the West Division.  The division existed until 1977, as the WHA decreased to only eight teams and divisions weren't used anymore.

Division lineups

1972–1973
Cleveland Crusaders
New England Whalers
New York Raiders
Ottawa Nationals
Philadelphia Blazers
Quebec Nordiques

1973–1974
Chicago Cougars
Cleveland Crusaders
New England Whalers
New York Golden Blades/Jersey Knights
Quebec Nordiques
Toronto Toros

Changes from the 1972–1973 season
The Philadelphia Blazers move to Vancouver, British Columbia and become the Vancouver Blazers, joining the West Division.
The Chicago Cougars move to the East Division from the West Division as a result of the Blazers moving to Vancouver.
The Ottawa Nationals relocate to Toronto, Ontario and become the Toronto Toros.
The New York Raiders are renamed to the New York Golden Blades.  The Golden Blades relocate to Cherry Hill, New Jersey and become the Jersey Knights during the 1973-74 season.

1974–1975
Chicago Cougars
Cleveland Crusaders
Indianapolis Racers
New England Whalers

Changes from the 1973–1974 season
 The Quebec Nordiques and Toronto Toros move from the East Division to the newly formed Canadian Division.
 The Indianapolis Racers join the East Division as an expansion team.

1975–1976
Cincinnati Stingers
Cleveland Crusaders
Indianapolis Racers
New England Whalers

Changes from the 1974–1975 season
The Chicago Cougars folded during the summer of 1975.
The Cincinnati Stingers join the East Division as an expansion team.

1976–1977
Birmingham Bulls
Cincinnati Stingers
Indianapolis Racers
Minnesota Fighting Saints
New England Whalers
Quebec Nordiques

Changes from the 1975–1976 season
The Cleveland Crusaders folded during the summer of 1976.
The Toronto Toros of the Canadian Division relocate to Birmingham, Alabama and become the Birmingham Bulls, joining the East Division.
The Minnesota Fighting Saints join the East Division from the West Division.
The Quebec Nordiques re-join the East Division as the Canadian Division is dissolved.

After the 1976–1977 season
The league folded four teams during the off-season, reducing the number of teams to eight, as the WHA decided not to use a divisional format.

Regular season Division Champions
1973 - New England Whalers (46–30–2, 94 pts)
1974 - New England Whalers (43–31–4, 90 pts)
1975 - New England Whalers (43–30–5, 91 pts)
1976 - Indianapolis Racers (35–39–6, 76 pts)
1977 - Quebec Nordiques (47–31–3, 97 pts)

Playoff Division Champions
1973 - New England Whalers
1974 - Chicago Cougars
1977 - Quebec Nordiques

Avco Cup winners produced
1973 - New England Whalers
1977 - Quebec Nordiques

Smythe Division Titles Won By Team

See also
 WHA West Division
 WHA Canadian Division

References

 WHA History

World Hockey Association